A Voice from the Attic is a collection of Robertson Davies' essays about reading aimed at intelligent and thoughtful readers, whom he calls the "clerisy". Initially published by McClelland and Stewart in 1960, A Voice from the Attic was republished during the early 1990s.

In the foreword to the 1990s edition, Davies wrote that while the essays were thirty-five to forty years old, they remained highly relevant. They run from musings on whether or not speed of reading and quality of reading are necessarily coincident, or even congruent, to essays on the nature of the popular book, to essays on the difference between the clerisy and the critic.

References

1960 non-fiction books
Books by Robertson Davies
Canadian essay collections
New Canadian Library
Books about literature